Ramón Delgado was the defending champion. This year he reached the final, losing, however, to 7th seed Rui Machado 2–6, 6–3, 5–7.

Seeds

Draw

Finals

Top half

Bottom half

References
 Main Draw
 Qualifying Draw

Copa Petrobras Asuncion - Singles
Copa Petrobras Asunción